Events from the year 1733 in Scotland.

Incumbents 

 Secretary of State for Scotland: vacant

Law officers 
 Lord Advocate – Duncan Forbes
 Solicitor General for Scotland – Charles Erskine

Judiciary 
 Lord President of the Court of Session – Lord North Berwick
 Lord Justice General – Lord Ilay
 Lord Justice Clerk – Lord Grange

Events 
 23 April–end of October – Wade's Bridge, Aberfeldy, designed by William Adam, built.
 May–December – First Secession from the Church of Scotland.

Births 
 4 January – Robert Mylne, architect (died 1811 in London)
 3 February – Alexander Wedderburn, 1st Earl of Rosslyn, Lord Chancellor of Great Britain (died 1805 in England)
 1 May – Archibald McLean, Baptist minister (died 1812)
 22 May – Alexander Monro, anatomist (died 1817)
 24 December – Thomas Bell, theologian (died 1802)
 John Forbes, general in Portuguese service (died 1808 in Brazil)
 Lewis Hutchinson, serial killer (hanged 1773 in Jamaica)

Deaths 
 January – Alexander Duncan, Episcopal Bishop of Glasgow (born c. 1655)
 27 January – Patrick Vanse, Member of Parliament (born c. 1655)
 31 October – David Boyle, 1st Earl of Glasgow, politician (born c. 1666)
 29 December – Sir Robert Grierson, 1st Baronet (born 1655/6)

The arts
 William Thomson publishes Orpheus caledonius: or, A collection of Scots songs.

See also 

 Timeline of Scottish history

References 

 
Years of the 18th century in Scotland
Scotland
1730s in Scotland